Craig Wise (born 15 September 1975) is an Australian former professional rugby league footballer who played for the Hunter Mariners and the Penrith Panthers.

Wise, who played in the lower grades for the Newcastle Knights, featured in the 1997 Super League season for the Hunter Mariners. He made four first-grade appearances for the Mariners, which included a club record-setting three tries in the round 11 win over the Penrith Panthers. In the 1998 NRL season, he switched to the Panthers, with the Mariners having been disbanded. In his only season at Penrith, he played in 13 premiership games.

References

External links
Craig Wise at Rugby League project

1975 births
Living people
Australian rugby league players
Hunter Mariners players
Penrith Panthers players
Rugby league centres
Rugby league locks